is a passenger railway station located in the city of Naruto, Tokushima Prefecture, Japan. It is operated by JR Shikoku and has the station number "N10".

Lines
Only local services stop at the station.

Layout
The station consists of an island platform serving two dead-headed tracks. The station building houses a waiting room and is staffed. Access to the island platform is by means of a level crossing. Parking is available at the station forecourt.

History
The new terminus took on the name of Muya while the former terminus became Ebisumae Station (ゑびす前駅). After the Awa Railway was nationalized on 1 July 1933, Japanese Government Railways (JGR) took over control of the station and operated it as part of the Awa Line until 20 March 1935 when some other stations on the line were absorbed into the Kōtoku Main Line. The station then became part of the Muya Line. On 1 August 1948, the station was renamed Naruto Station. On 1 March 1956, the line which served the station was renamed the Naruto Line. On 1 April 1987, with the privatization of Japanese National Railways (JNR), the successor of JGR, the station came under the control of JR Shikoku.

Passenger statistics
In fiscal 2019, the station was used by an average of 1502 passengers daily

Surrounding area
Japan National Route 28

See also
 List of Railway Stations in Japan

References

External links

Naruto Station (JR Shikoku)

Railway stations in Tokushima Prefecture
Railway stations in Japan opened in 1928
Naruto, Tokushima